Jeffrey R. Daw (born February 28, 1972) is a Canadian former professional ice hockey centre who played in one National Hockey League game for the Colorado Avalanche during the 2001–02 NHL season. As a youth, he played in the 1986 Quebec International Pee-Wee Hockey Tournament with a minor ice hockey team from Flamborough, Ontario.

Career statistics

Regular season and playoffs

See also
List of players who played only one game in the NHL

References

External links

1972 births
Living people
Canadian ice hockey centres
Cleveland Lumberjacks players
Colorado Avalanche players
Danbury Trashers players
Elmira Jackals (UHL) players
Hamilton Bulldogs (AHL) players
Hershey Bears players
Houston Aeros (1994–2013) players
Ice hockey people from Ontario
Sportspeople from Hamilton, Ontario
Lowell Lock Monsters players
Providence Bruins players
St. John's Maple Leafs players
Springfield Falcons players
UMass Lowell River Hawks men's ice hockey players
Undrafted National Hockey League players
Wheeling Nailers players
Canadian expatriate ice hockey players in the United States